Brevig may refer to:

People
 Eric Brevig (born 1957), American film director 
 Hans Christian Brevig (1904-1974), Norwegian farmer and politician

Places
 Brevig, former name of Brevik, Norway
 Brevig, Barra, Scotland
 Brevig Mission, Alaska, United States
 Brevig Mission Airport, Alaska, United States

See also
 Brevik (disambiguation)